Two related investigations by New York State and City officials were opened by 2020 to determine whether the Trump Organization has committed financial fraud. One of these is a criminal case being conducted by the Manhattan district attorney (DA) and the other is a civil case being conducted by the New York State Attorney General (AG).
The DA's case has led to two of the organization's subsidiary companies being found guilty of 17 charges including tax fraud, while the AG has succeeded in imposing an independent monitor to prevent future fraud by the organization.

By mid-2021, New York AG Letitia James had joined the DA's criminal probe, with the latter convening a grand jury. Prosecutors filed 10 charges against the organization, alleging that it had conducted a  "scheme to defraud" the government, and 15 felony counts against longtime chief financial officer Allen Weisselberg—who invoked his Fifth Amendment right against self-incrimination more than 500 times in his testimony. In August 2022, Weisselberg pleaded guilty and agreed to testify against the organization in exchange for a reduced sentence. In December, the organization was convicted of all 17 criminal charges it faced. Evidence including the testimonies of Weisselberg and others indicate that he and other executives—as well as the two subsidiaries—participated in fraudulent schemes, including recording some employee bonuses as pay for contract work. A number of illegal practices were ceased around the time of Donald Trump's election as U.S. president.

In 2020, Eric Trump pleaded the Fifth over 500 times in his testimony for the AG. In November 2021, The Washington Post reported that between 2011 and 2015 the organization presented several properties as being worth far more to potential lenders than to tax officials. Donald Trump reportedly pleaded the Fifth more than 400 times in his August 2022 deposition. In September, James filed a civil lawsuit against Trump, his three oldest children, and the organization for alleged fraud. Additionally, she referred the case to federal criminal prosecutors and the Internal Revenue Service. In November, the New York judge overseeing the lawsuit appointed retired judge Barbara S. Jones to monitor the organization, and a trial was scheduled for late 2023.

Background

The financial statements of the Trump Organization's holdings are private, and there exist a wide range of estimates of the organization's true value. Donald Trump has been accused on several occasions of deliberately inflating the valuation of Trump Organization properties through the aggressive lobbying of the media, in particular the authors of the annual Forbes 400 list, in order to bolster his perceived net worth among the public over several decades. He has released little definitive financial documentation to the public to confirm his valuation claims.
It is difficult to determine a net value for the Trump Organization's real-estate holdings independently since each individual property may be encumbered by debt.
In October 2015, Forbes published an article detailing its decades-long struggle to estimate the true net worth of Trump and the organization.

On a Schedule C form filed in 1984 for a purported consulting business, Trump reported no income but over $600,000 in unknown expenses. After New York State and City auditors rejected the unexplained expenses, Trump requested a tax trial. In separate 1992 trials, state and city judges ruled against Trump. In the city case Trump's only witness was the lawyer and accountant who prepared his returns for over 20 years, who testified that although it had his signature he did not prepare the 1984 return he was presented a photocopy of (the original copy being unavailable); Trump asserted that he had been subjected to double taxation, in response to which the judge wrote that "The problem at issue is [instead one] of no taxation." In June 2016 (during Trump's presidential campaign), investigative journalist David Cay Johnston argued that the proceedings demonstrated evidence of intentional tax fraud and that Trump should release his tax returns to disclose whether he had repeated such behavior.

In a defamation case against TrumpNation author Timothy L. O'Brien, Donald Trump testified in 2007 that "I think everybody" exaggerates their property values and that he did not do so "beyond reason". He said he would give his opinion to chief financial officer (CFO) Allen Weisselberg, who "predominately" determined final values, which Trump called "conservative". Regarding one case in which a property increased from $80 million in 2005 to $150 million in 2006, Trump stated, "The property was valued very low, in my opinion, then and it became very—it just has gone up." He was unable to provide a reason for this other than his opinion. Between 2011 and 2015, the Trump Organization presented several properties as being worth millions of dollars—in one case over $500 million—more to potential lenders than to tax officials; this was reported by The Washington Post in November 2021. In January 2017, ahead of Trump's inauguration as U.S. president, his attorney Sheri Dillon announced that the organization's businesses would be transferred to a trust controlled by Trump's sons Donald Jr. and Eric Trump, as well as Weisselberg.

In October 2018, The New York Times published a lengthy exposé concerning Donald Trump's inheritance from his parents, Fred and Mary Anne MacLeod Trump. It includes detailed analyses of Trump family financial records. The article describes an alleged tax fraud scheme conducted by Trump and his siblings related to their joint inheritance of their parents's real estate holdings, effectively evading over $500 million in gift and estate taxes. The alleged schemes involve money from the companies being siphoned to the children throughout their lives and understating the value of transferred properties. The New York State Department of Taxation and Finance announced on the day of the exposé's publication that it would review the allegations. In mid-2021, Mary L. Trump (a primary source for the exposé) elaborated on how the organization used a shell corporation to siphon money, devaluing Fred Trump's "core business" to $30 million at the time of his death.

In August 2018, Manhattan District Attorney (DA) Cyrus Vance Jr. was reported to be considering a criminal investigation of the organization and two of its senior executives for their reimbursement of then-Trump personal attorney Michael Cohen for his hush-money payment to Stormy Daniels; the organization recorded the reimbursement as a legal expense although Cohen did no legal work in the matter. In August 2019, Vance subpoenaed the organization's accountants, Mazars, for Trump's tax returns. In July 2020, the U.S. Supreme Court ruled that Trump's tax records could be released to prosecutors, producing millions of pages of documents, reportedly including Trump's returns from January 2011 to August 2019. In November 2022, the DA's office (then under Alvin Bragg) was reportedly again scrutinizing the hush-money affair in a possible move towards mounting a criminal case against Trump. At the end of the month, following a Supreme Court ruling, the U.S. Treasury Department released Trump's returns from 2015 to 2020 to the House Ways and Means Committee. The committee subsequently voted to make these public.

In February 2019, prompted by U.S. House Representative Alexandria Ocasio-Cortez  asking whether Trump had ever presented inflated assets to an insurance company, Cohen testified to Congress that Trump "inflated [the organization's] total assets when it served his purposes, such as trying to be listed amongst the wealthiest people in Forbes, and deflated his assets to reduce his real estate taxes." Following Cohen's testimony, in March, the New York State Department of Financial Services issued a subpoena to Aon, the organization's longtime insurance broker. The same month, the office of New York Attorney General (AG) Letitia James began investigating the organization, having stated that she intended to do so during her 2018 campaign. By September 2019, the organization was under federal investigation by the Southern District of New York regarding inflated insurance claims allegations. By December, James's office had subpoenaed the organization for some records which it subsequently failed to provide for at least 21 months.

Criminal case

The Manhattan DA suggested in an August 2020 federal court filing that the organization was under investigation for bank and insurance fraud. That November, The New York Times reported that both investigators had recently issued subpoenas to the organization regarding tax deductions on millions of dollars in consulting fees, some of which were apparently paid to Ivanka Trump. By December 2020, the Manhattan DA had interviewed employees of Aon and Deutsche Bank, and hired FTI Consulting to provide forensic analysis to determine whether the organization had altered asset values for financial gain.

The first grand jury resulted in charges against longtime CFO Allen Weisselberg, who subsequently provided testimony against the organization, which was in turn used to convict two subsidiary companies. After the sentencing of the companies on January 13, 2023, Bragg stated that the broader investigation of the organization would continue.

First grand jury 
On May 18, 2021, the New York AG's office announced that it was joining the Manhattan DA's office in probing the organization "in a criminal capacity." The Manhattan DA convened a special grand jury to consider indicting Trump, his company and/or executives. Jeffrey McConney, a senior vice president and controller who had worked for almost 35 years at the company, testified before the grand jury after being subpoenaed.

On July 1, New York prosecutors charged the organization with a "15 year 'scheme to defraud' the government", conspiracy, and falsifying business records. Prosecutors filed 10 charges against the organization and its Trump Payroll Corporation entity, and 15 felony counts against Weisselberg. Prosecutors allege that Weisselberg received about $1.76 million in undeclared indirect compensation in the form of free rent and utilities, car leases for himself and his wife, and school tuition for his grandchildren (the checks for which Trump allegedly signed). They further allege that the organization kept track of the fringe benefits on internal spreadsheets and did not report them as taxable income. Both the organization and Weisselberg pleaded not guilty. On July 8, the organization removed Weisselberg as director of the company running Trump International Golf Links, Scotland, and on July 9, it removed him as director of 40 subsidiaries registered in Florida.
In his deposition, Weisselberg invoked his Fifth Amendment right against self-incrimination over 500 times.

In October, Manhattan judge Juan Merchan held a trial regarding the organization's failure to comply with four grand jury subpoenas and three court orders; on this basis, in December, Merchan held the company in contempt of court and ordered the Trump Corporation and Trump Payroll Corporation to pay $4,000 in fines. The ruling remained sealed until December 2022 to avoid influencing the trial.

Later in October 2021, Trump testified in Galicia v. Trump that he personally oversaw Calamari Sr.'s compensation.

Second grand jury 
A second grand jury began to hear evidence on November 4, 2021.
By November 22, prosecutors were scrutinizing several of the organization's properties for which, between 2011 and 2015, far higher values were presented to potential lenders than were reported to tax officials. In the most extreme case, in 2012, the 40 Wall Street building was cited as being worth $527 million to the former, but only $16.7 million to the latter.
By mid-December, prosecutors were reportedly examining whether the organization provided its outside accountants, Mazars USA, with cherry-picked information with which to prepare favorable financial statements to present to prospective lenders. Mazars provided disclaimers with its financial statements for the organization, indicating that the firm had not given any assurances about them, and noting that "Donald J. Trump is responsible for the preparation and fair presentation of the financial statement in accordance with accounting principles generally accepted in the United States".
On February 9, 2022, Mazars informed the organization that it would no longer support the financial statements it had prepared for the organization from mid-2010 to mid-2020.

On February 22, 2022, Bragg told two of his lead prosecutors, Mark F. Pomerantz and Carey R. Dunne, that he was not ready to indict Trump based on the difficulty of proving that he had criminal intent. The two prosecutors resigned the following day, with Pomerantz writing in his resignation letter that there is "evidence sufficient to establish Mr. Trump's guilt beyond a reasonable doubt" regarding "numerous felony violations" and that Vance had directed his deputies to seek indictments. (A year later, Pomerantz published a book about his work with the investigation.)

The New York Times reported that the resignations followed a monthlong pause of evidence being presented to the jury, as well as discussions about charging Trump with conspiracy and falsifying financial records (instead of a fraud charge). On February 24, Bragg recruited his investigations chief to the lead prosecutor role. On April 7, Bragg insisted that the investigation was still ongoing, with new evidence being reviewed. On April 26, a court filing related to Galicia v. Trump revealed that Trump had admitted to overseeing Calamari Sr.'s compensation. Witnesses were still being interviewed as of late April, shortly before the jury expired.

Trial 
On August 12, 2022, Merchan agreed to dismiss one charge against the company as the statute of limitations had lapsed.

On August 18, Weisselberg pleaded guilty to 15 felonies and agreed to testify against the organization in a plea deal in which he is set to serve five months in prison followed by five years of probation and must pay nearly $2 million in back taxes, interest, and penalties. Bragg argued that the plea "directly implicates the Trump Organization in a wide range of criminal activity", while the organization refused a plea deal, reportedly because the DA wanted it to plead guilty to felonies while Trump lawyers suggested a plea to a misdemeanor. The organization asserted that the corporate entities would plead not guilty as they had "done nothing wrong".

Jury selection was held from October 24–28, and opening statements began October 31. On that day, prosecutors asserted that Weisselberg had ordered payments to be deleted from ledgers following Trump's election as U.S. president. Lawyers for the organization claimed that Weisselberg profited from the company without its or Trump's knowledge. Jeffrey McConney testified that he deducted the cost of fringe-benefit items from gross salaries, resulting in lower tax payments. Additionally, McConney said that after Trump's election, attorney Sheri Dillon oversaw an overhaul of the organization's tax practices. McConney testified that a page of Trump's personal ledger from 2012 had been altered to remove Weisselberg's name from a payment of over $30,000 to a private school. McConney later testified that he "knew it wasn't correct [but] wasn't sure it was illegal" to pay Weisselberg's wife $6,000 for a job she did not perform so she could gain Social Security benefits. Both McConney and Weisselberg said they relied on Mazars accountant Donald Bender, who served the organization for a number of years, to assure the legality of their actions. McConney was declared a hostile witness, and subsequently, evidence was presented that the company provided a number of people (including Allen and Barry Weisselberg) benefits logged as payments for independent contract work. Weisselberg testified that this scheme was amongst a number of illegal tax practices the organization ceased around the time of Trump's election. Weisselberg said he and McConney altered the former's payroll record to deduct the cost of bonuses and that they falsified W-2 forms. Weisselberg stated that some fringe payments to employees were as high as $100,000 and that this practice had been performed via Form 1099 since the 1980s. He testified that he received $1.76 million in untaxed benefits and that Trump authorized the compensation for him and other senior executives. Weisselberg testified that the Trumps did not know about his scheme to dodge taxes by using his paychecks to reimburse the organization for tuition checks for his grandchildren, which were signed by Donald Trump and (in 2017) Donald Jr. When asked, Weisselberg stated that "I committed [the tax-fraud] crimes with Jeffrey McConney [whom] I dealt with directly [as well as the] Trump Corporation and Trump Payroll Corporation." Weisselberg went on to testify that in 2017, after Eric and Donald Trump Jr. learned of his scheme, he used its cessation to negotiate a raise from them—procuring an additional $200,000 starting in 2019.

On November 21, the prosecution rested its case, opting not to call as a witness Donald Bender, who had been granted immunity for previously providing testimony. The defense began the same day, calling Bender to the stand and presenting documents potentially suggesting his partial awareness of company executives receiving fringe benefits reported as independent contract work. Bender testified that Weisselberg claimed to meet the requirements to be paid as an independent contractor. He further testified that the two corporate entities and some employees had lowered their taxes via the payment of bonuses as if it was for consulting work. After being shown the company's general ledger, on which perks provided to Weisselberg and other executives were apparently obvious, Bender stated that it was not his responsibility to review. The defense attempted to discredit him as a witness and the same day, rested its case.

During closing arguments, the defense argued that Weisselberg acted "solely to benefit himself", with only McConney and Bender sharing his fault. Contrarily, the prosecution asserted that ample evidence has shown that Weisselberg intended to benefit the company (to a lesser extent than himself), with McConney helping him and another executive lower their salaries and use the  savings to pay for perks on the company's behalf—as well as lower its payroll costs and payroll taxes related to Medicare. The prosecution highlighted a secret log McConney used to track reduced salaries and corresponding perks requested by Weisselberg and others, leading to separate books being provided to the Internal Revenue Service (IRS). According to the prosecution, the organization saved $3.5 million from Weisselberg's scheme and at a certain point benefited more from it than him. The prosecution alleged that Donald Trump was aware of the fraudulent schemes and that he "explicitly [sanctioned] tax fraud", citing a 2012 document with his signature authorizing a reduction of Calamari Sr.'s salary by the same amount as his Park Avenue apartment rent, but said proving Trump's knowledge was unnecessary to implicate the company. The defense objected to the accusation and used it to call for a mistrial, which the judge denied.

Per New York law, the jury had to find that Weisselberg (and/or McConney) acted "in behalf of" the organization in order to declare it guilty of Weisselberg's crimes; according to Merchan, this required it to be shown that "there was some intent to benefit the corporation" but this need not have been Weisselberg's main goal. About 400 exhibits were presented as evidence, some thousands of pages long. According to one juror, the jury referred to Trump as "Smith" to reduce bias and suspected that he and his family likely knew about the fraud scheme. The jury unanimously found the organization guilty of fraud and carefully considered each charge.

On December 6, the organization was convicted of all 17 criminal charges it faced, nine for the Trump Corporation and eight for the Trump Payroll Corporation. On January 10, 2023, Weisselberg was sentenced in accordance with his plea deal.
On January 13, the organization was fined the maximum allowable $1.6 million (with three charges for tax fraud plus several others for offenses such as conspiracy and falsifying business records). The organization could be further impacted by banks and businesses with internal policies against dealing with felons.

On February 1, 2023, Michael Cohen acknowledged that his cell phone had recently been given to the Manhattan district attorney. This was the same evidence that had been seized by FBI investigators in 2018.

Civil case 

In March 2019, the office of New York AG (OAG) Letitia James began investigating the organization. In August 2020, James disclosed in a court filing that it was conducting a civil investigation of the organization for the asset inflation allegation, asking a court to compel the organization to provide information it had been withholding. In September, New York judge Arthur Engoron ordered Eric Trump to sit for a deposition; he was deposed on October 5 and reportedly invoked his Fifth Amendment right against self-incrimination over 500 times.

On September 2, 2021, Judge Engoron ordered the organization to submit a report explaining what it was doing to comply with subpoenas from the OAG.
On December 1, James subpoenaed Trump in the civil case. Ivanka and Donald Trump Jr. were issued subpoenas in the matter on the same day.

On December 20, Trump's lawyer Alina Habba filed a lawsuit in federal court against James, alleging that her case against the former president was "guided solely by political animus and a desire to harass, intimidate, and retaliate against a private citizen who she views as a political opponent" and that his civil rights were being violated. The next month, James filed a motion requesting that Trump's suit be dismissed, arguing that he was only trying to block his deposition. On May 27, U.S. District Court judge Brenda K. Sannes dismissed the suit. On June 1, Trump filed a federal notice of appeal. On August 16, Habba requested that the U.S. Court of Appeals for the 2nd Circuit revive the lawsuit. On January 24, 2023, Trump's team withdrew the appeal.

A court filing from January 3, 2022, noted that Ivanka and Donald Trump Jr. and their father had moved to block their subpoenas on the premise that the AG was attempting to sidestep due process to gather evidence against them in the related criminal case. On January 10, Habba filed a motion seeking a stay of proceedings to allow an injunction against James on the same essential basis as Trump's lawsuit against the AG. On January 31, James filed a motion arguing that her case "presents no emergency requiring the extraordinary relief of a preliminary injunction".

On January 18, James filed a motion to compel Trump and his two oldest children to appear in court and provide documents. Investigators alleged that Trump's financial statements were used to secure more than $300 million in loans, and that these "were generally inflated as part of a pattern to suggest that Mr. Trump's net worth was higher than it otherwise would have appeared". According to the AG's motion, of over five million documents provided by the company overall, only three were provided by Trump himself.

The New York AG's filing cites financial inaccuracies including the organization's golf course near Aberdeen, Scotland, which the AG said was valued at $435.56 million by Trump in 2014, over twice its previous year estimate. Additionally, James cited Trump's own three-story penthouse apartment in Trump Tower, which he reported as being 30,000 square feet; it is actually about 11,000 square feet, and according to Forbes worth perhaps a third of Trump's valuation. According to a later court filing, Weisselberg "admitted that the apartment's value had been overstated by 'give or take' $200 million".
On February 9, Mazars informed the organization that it would no longer support the financial statements it had prepared for the organization from mid-2010 to mid-2020, owing to findings from the New York AG's January 18 filing and other sources.

On February 17, Judge Arthur Engoron ruled in favor of James's subpoenas. The judge affirmed that refusals by the Trumps to answer potentially incriminating questions in the civil case should not be cited in the criminal matter. Habba accused James of bias and "prosecutorial misconduct", to which Engoron maintained that "a prosecutor [disliking] someone does not prevent a prosecution." On March 28, James moved to uphold that all three Trumps must testify, citing an example of a group of apartments being valued over 66 times the outside evaluation of $750,000.
On May 26, the First Judicial Department of the Supreme Court of New York State upheld Engoron's February ruling that the Trumps must testify. On June 14, New York State's highest court dismissed the Trumps' appeal request.

On April 7, James asked the court to hold Trump in civil contempt and impose a daily fine of $10,000 for "not [complying] at all" with the March 31 deadline for subpoenaed documents. On April 25, Engoron held Trump in civil contempt and approved the daily fine. On April 29, Engoron rejected an affidavit from Trump denying that he had the requested documents and ordered him to file a new one answering "where he believes such files are currently located" to release him from contempt. On May 6, Trump's lawyers filed a 66-page document detailing the search for subpoenaed documents and an affidavit from Trump swearing that there were no relevant documents that had not yet been produced. On May 11, Engoron agreed to purge Trump's contempt on the basis of certain conditions being met by May 20, including that Trump pay a retroactively reduced fine of $110,000, the completion of a third-party firm's search, and that further affidavits explain the organization's document-retention policies. On May 31, Trump's longtime executive assistant Rhona Graff disclosed that the organization did not have a document-retention policy and she could not recall Trump keeping copies of documents. Citing Graff's testimony as conflicting with Trump's claim in late April that it was his "customary practice to delegate document handling and retention responsibilities to ... executive assistants", the AG asked the judge to require the submission of additional evidence. On June 8, Engoron ruled that Trump would remain in contempt unless officials from the organization provided by June 17 sworn statements explaining what happened to Trump's handwritten instructions after they were delivered to the organization's golf, hotel, legal and marketing departments. On June 19, Business Insider cited a former organization employee who stated that there was no document-retention policy regarding Trump's written instructions. On June 20, the OAG agreed to the contempt order being lifted, which was done on June 29.

On June 2, James stated that there was clear evidence of fraudulent valuation by Trump and suggested the dissolution of the organization as one action a lawsuit may call for.
Donald Jr. and Ivanka were reportedly deposed on July 28 and August 3, respectively. Neither reportedly pleaded the Fifth Amendment, with Donald Jr. reportedly answering all questions. Donald Jr. testified that his knowledge of accounting was minimal and that from 2010 onwards, he did not help prepare the company's financial statements and had at most influenced them via tangential input. On August 10, Donald Sr. was deposed for four hours and pleaded the Fifth over 400 times, with his only detailed comment reputedly being an attack on the AG and her inquiry.

Lawsuit
On September 21, James announced a lawsuit against Trump, his three oldest children, and the organization for fraud and other forms of misrepresentation, citing over 200 alleged instances and asserting that Trump "wildly exaggerated his net worth by billions of dollars". James cited New York Executive Law § 63(12) as lending her "broad and special powers". The suit asserts that between 2011 and 2021 Trump and the organization made over 200 "false and misleading valuations of assets on his annual Statements of Financial Condition to defraud financial institutions" and, amongst other charges, that he used low valuations to avoid paying between $85 and $150 million in interest charges on loans from Deutsche Bank. The suit seeks about $250 million in damages, the instatement of a five-year ban on the company conducting real-estate transactions in the state and a permanent bar against Trump and his three oldest children from officiating or directing any business or corporation there. Additionally, James cited evidence of potential criminal insurance and bank fraud, for which she referred the case to federal criminal prosecutors in Manhattan and the IRS.

Besides the inflated values of Trump Tower—as well as its square footage—and 40 Wall Street, James's lawsuit alleges that in his financial statements, Trump inflated the value of Mar-a-Lago by perhaps ten times. Trump also omitted restrictions regarding his 30% share in 1290 Avenue of the Americas and portrayed his interests as cash, while overstating the building's overall value by $1.5 billion. Additionally, according to the suit, the organization valued Trump Park Avenue at $350 million, while a 2010 valuation found it to be worth $72.5 million. Twelve rent-stabilized apartments in that building were appraised by a bank at a total of $750,000, but claimed by the organization to be worth as much as $50 million. Further, Trump purportedly multiplied the value of 4–8 East 57th Street by a fixed percentage to inflate its valuation to $422 million, while neglecting to mention that his rent to the property owner was significantly increasing.

Trump asserted that the disclaimers provided by Mazars on its financial statements for the organization absolve him of fraud because they admit the valuations "may be way off".
On October 13, as neither Donald nor Eric Trump had yet accepted service of the lawsuit, the OAG asked Judge Engoron for permission to electronically deliver the lawsuit to them, which he granted; the AG emailed links to relevant documents the same day. The OAG accused the organization of continuing to engage in fraud after the suit was filed and possibly beginning to restructure its business, and asked Engoron to order Trump to sufficiently disclose valuation methods to an independent monitor when dealing with lenders or insurers. On October 25, an administrative judge refused to have the case reassigned to another judge.

On November 2, Trump filed a lawsuit in a Florida circuit court asking for an injunction against James, asserting that she wished to obtain records related to Trump's revocable trust (the organization's owner), which arguably fall under the protection of privacy rights granted by the Constitution of Florida. In November, the lawsuit was removed to federal court. On December 21, federal judge Donald Middlebrooks dismissed the suit, and Trump withdrew it on January 20, 2023.

On November 3, 2022, Engoron noted "persistent misrepresentations throughout every one of Mr. Trump's [financial statements] between 2011 and 2021". Engoron then
imposed an independent monitor,
ruled that the organization must gain court approval before selling assets, and required Trump to provide 14 days notice before transferring any non-cash asset listed on his 2021 financial statement.

Both the OAG and organization suggested retired judge Barbara S. Jones serve as the independent monitor; she was appointed that month and began monitoring the organization by December. Early that month, Ivanka Trump was released as a defendant (including the monitoring process) on the basis that she was no longer involved with the company.

On November 22, Engoron tentatively scheduled trial for October 2, 2023. On January 6, 2023, Engoron dismissed the defense's request to dismiss the lawsuit, which he labelled "frivolous" due to it relying on previously rebuffed arguments; he also denied Ivanka Trump's request to dismiss the charges against her.

Reactions 

Some commenters pointed out the irony of Donald Trump being faced with pleading the Fifth Amendment, which he has expressed disdain for doing, saying it implies a party's guilt. In December 2020, Fox News host Sean Hannity stated that "The president out the door needs to pardon his whole family and himself because they want this witch hunt to go on in perpetuity, they're so full of rage and insanity against the president."

In mid-2021, the Republican National Committee (RNC) agreed to financially support Trump's legal defense in both inquiries. In October, it paid $121,670 to a law firm employed by Trump. The next month, a Republican (GOP) spokesperson called Trump "a leader of our party [whose] record of achievement is critical to the GOP" and referred to the investigations as a "never ending witch hunt" by Democrats. In December, it was reported that the RNC had agreed to pay up to $1.6 million of Trump's legal expenses for both cases. Speaking to Hannity on Fox News in February 2022, Eric Trump argued that the investigations were only being conducted because his father was "clearly the frontrunner for 2024". The RNC indicated that it would cut off legal funding for Trump as required if he officially announced his candidacy. Later in July, Rolling Stone reported that Trump hoped to use the executive office to protect him from federal prosecution, but "The law is less clear on whether a president can face prosecution from states while in office."

In January 2022, NBC News cited a criminal defense lawyer it employs as a legal analyst, who observed: "Generally, lying to a bank to obtain a loan can be a crime." A former president has never been criminally indicted, with Richard Nixon being pardoned in 1974 for any crimes he may have committed in office. A New York defense lawyer who worked for Cyrus Vance Jr. calls a potential trial against Trump a "logistical nightmare", saying it "would be unprecedented in a courthouse that has seen many, many high-profile cases over the decades." The director of public information for New York's state courts points out that 4,000 court officers (with training similar to police) are employed to uphold public safety if necessary.

In early September, law professor Jessica Levinson stated on NPR that Trump's potential campaign for the 2024 presidential election "will have no legal impact on any of the criminal investigations against him [but] will have a huge political impact" regarding the rule of law and future elections. On September 22, The Wall Street Journal editorial board—having written earlier in the year that the investigation "looks like more evidence of the decline of America's rule of law"—stated that "Trump has made a business and political career of getting away with whatever he can, and it's easy to imagine he crossed a line." Later in the month, a former assistant DA and asset forfeiture chief in the Manhattan DA's office argued, "This is going to be a very difficult case for the defendants to win. One of the best defenses to this matter is to delay." New York Times columnist Gail Collins opined that Trump supporters would not be alienated by the former president's apparent fraud due to his already being well-known for distorting the truth.

A Curbed article from October about the state of Trump's real-estate empire in New York City concludes that "In effect, his footprint in New York has already been shrinking for years, and James's lawsuit, while it may never come to fruition, has already laid that bare." Michael Cohen predicted that the lawsuit would "financially destroy" Trump and lead to his being perp walked.

In November 2022, CBS News reported that three law firms involved in the criminal trial had received more than $500,000 from the Save America PAC and the RNC over the previous two months. In February 2023, The New York Times reported that in 2021 and 2022, the Save America PAC spent $16 million in legal-related payments, some which were directed to firms representing Trump's company.

On November 16, 2022, a New York appeals court ruled that Cohen could sue the organization to reimburse legal fees (in the range of millions of dollars) for Trump-related litigation including the investigations by the DA and AG. After the organization's conviction in the criminal case, Cohen stated that Trump "should be very uncomfortable" regarding his own testimony to the DA's office.
Some speculated that the conviction would be highly damaging to the company's reputation, with a law professor at Pace University calling it a "death knell". Bloomberg opined that the felony charges would be eclipsed by their impact. On January 1, 2023, an MSNBC opinion columnist cited the investigations amongst several others in arguing that Trump was likely to be charged that year. Writing for New York Daily News, David Cay Johnston opined that Trump could be convicted on "easy-to-prove state income tax fraud charges" based on documents available to the DA's office, including Trump's publicly released tax returns which Johnston said were "rich with what the IRS calls 'badges of fraud,'" such as "hundreds of thousands of dollars in unexplained expenses" on numerous Schedule C forms showing zero income and "revenues and expenses that [suspiciously match] to the dollar". Johnston pointed out that the former method was used by Trump in 1984 and (according to Johnston) found by New York judges to constitute civil tax fraud, which he argued that Trump undoubtedly knew before repeating 26 times, thus providing evidence of mens rea (knowledge of one's criminal intent).

Some political experts have argued that the fallout of the December 2022 criminal conviction would do little to damage Trump's political career due to his not being personally convicted. Contrarily, some with inside knowledge of the investigations argue that Trump has been personally implicated via the guilty verdict against his company, despite denials of wrongdoing made on his behalf.

Writing for The New York Times, Maggie Haberman cited the investigations as being two of several against Trump highlighting his similar defensive tactics, summarized by former U.S. attorney and FBI official Chuck Rosenberg as being that "he thinks that everything can be bought or fought."

On February 22, 2023, Forbes reported that "new revelations about Trump Tower suggest that the building is—and always was—something of a fraud." The article cites (1) "Property records [showing] that [Trump] has been lying about the financial performance of the building since it first opened in 1983," (2) financial documents indicating that "Trump lied about the square footage of the office and retail space at the base of the property" (separate from the inflation of his penthouse), and (3) "Portions of a [newly released] 2015 audio recording [which] prove that Trump was personally involved in the efforts to lie about the value of Trump Tower's commercial space". Forbes concluded that "The Trump Organization lied about the value of its properties to lenders for years, and although multiple people ... participated ... the person at the center of the deceit was Donald Trump."

See also
 List of lawsuits involving Donald Trump

Notes

References

Donald Trump controversies
Donald Trump litigation
The Trump Organization